Henriëtte van Aalderen-Sprée (born 14 April 1976) is a Dutch former professional tennis player.

Born in Amsterdam, Van Aalderen competed in professional tournaments during the 1990s. She won three ITF singles titles and 12 ITF doubles titles. Her only WTA Tour main-draw appearance came in the doubles at Rosmalen in 1996, partnering Annemarie Mikkers.

ITF Circuit finals

Singles (3–1)

Doubles (12–6)

References

External links
 
 

1976 births
Living people
Dutch female tennis players
Tennis players from Amsterdam
20th-century Dutch women
20th-century Dutch people
21st-century Dutch women